Svetlana Tarasevich (born 14 August 1979) is a Belarusian former gymnast. She competed in five events at the 1996 Summer Olympics.

Eponymous skill
Tarasevich has one eponymous skill listed in the Code of Points.

Competitive history

References

External links
 

1979 births
Living people
Belarusian female artistic gymnasts
Olympic gymnasts of Belarus
Gymnasts at the 1996 Summer Olympics
Sportspeople from Grodno
Originators of elements in artistic gymnastics